Ivan Raimundo Pinheiro (born 22 October 1965) is a Brazilian former handball player. He competed in the men's tournament at the 1996 Summer Olympics.

References

External links
 

1965 births
Living people
Brazilian male handball players
Olympic handball players of Brazil
Handball players at the 1996 Summer Olympics
People from Petrolina
Sportspeople from Pernambuco
Pan American Games silver medalists for Brazil
Pan American Games medalists in handball
Medalists at the 1991 Pan American Games
Medalists at the 1995 Pan American Games
Medalists at the 1999 Pan American Games
Handball players at the 1999 Pan American Games
20th-century Brazilian people